Big River Township is the name of two townships in the U.S. state of Missouri:

Big River Township, Jefferson County, Missouri
Big River Township, Saint Francois County, Missouri

See also
Big River (disambiguation)

Missouri township disambiguation pages